The following are operators of the Bristol Beaufighter:

Military operators

Australia
Royal Australian Air Force
European Theatre
No. 455 Squadron RAAF (maritime strike)
No. 456 Squadron RAAF (night fighter)
Pacific Theatre
No. 22 Squadron RAAF
No. 30 Squadron RAAF
No. 31 Squadron RAAF
No. 92 Squadron RAAF
No. 93 Squadron RAAF

Canada
Royal Canadian Air Force
 No. 404 Squadron RCAF
 No. 406 Squadron RCAF
 No. 409 Squadron RCAF
 No. 410 Squadron RCAF

Dominican Republic
Fuerza Aérea Dominicana
Escuadron de Caza-Bombardeo received 10 TF.X (rebuilt back to VIF standard) aircraft in 1948. Aircraft received numbers from 306 to 315 and were used until June 1954.

Israel
Israeli Air Force
103 Squadron operated 4 TF.X aircraft between July and November 1948.

New Zealand
New Zealand Squadrons of the Royal Air Force
 No. 488 (NZ) Squadron RAF
 No. 489 (NZ) Squadron RAF

Poland
Polish Air Forces (in exile in Great Britain)
 No. 307 Polish Night Fighter Squadron "Lwowskich Puchaczy"

Portugal
Portuguese Navy
 B Squadron of the Navy Air Forces operated 15 TF.X aircraft acquired by Portugal, delivered during March and April 1945. Next two aircraft were delivered in 1946 after overhaul by Bristol company. All aircraft were delivered from RAF stocks.

South Africa
South African Air Force
 No. 16 Squadron SAAF
 No. 19 Squadron SAAF (also known as RAF No. 227 Squadron)

Turkey
Turkish Air Force
First Beaufighters TF.X (at least nine) were delivered in 1944 straight from frontline units. Another 23 TF.X aircraft were bought in 1946.

United Kingdom
Royal Air Force

 No. 5 Squadron RAF
 No. 17 Squadron RAF
 No. 20 Squadron RAF
 No. 22 Squadron RAF
 No. 25 Squadron RAF
 No. 27 Squadron RAF
 No. 29 Squadron RAF
 No. 30 Squadron RAF
 No. 34 Squadron RAF
 No. 39 Squadron RAF
 No. 42 Squadron RAF
 No. 45 Squadron RAF
 No. 46 Squadron RAF
 No. 47 Squadron RAF
 No. 48 Squadron RAF
 No. 68 Squadron RAF
 No. 69 Squadron RAF
 No. 84 Squadron RAF
 No. 89 Squadron RAF
 No. 96 Squadron RAF
 No. 108 Squadron RAF
 No. 125 Squadron RAF
 No. 141 Squadron RAF
 No. 143 Squadron RAF
 No. 144 Squadron RAF
 No. 153 Squadron RAF
 No. 169 Squadron RAF
 No. 173 Squadron RAF
 No. 176 Squadron RAF
 No. 177 Squadron RAF

 No. 211 Squadron RAF
 No. 216 Squadron RAF
 No. 217 Squadron RAF
 No. 219 Squadron RAF
 No. 227 Squadron RAF
 No. 234 Squadron RAF
 No. 235 Squadron RAF
 No. 236 Squadron RAF
 No. 239 Squadron RAF
 No. 248 Squadron RAF
 No. 252 Squadron RAF
 No. 254 Squadron RAF
 No. 255 Squadron RAF
 No. 256 Squadron RAF
 No. 272 Squadron RAF
 No. 285 Squadron RAF
 No. 287 Squadron RAF
 No. 288 Squadron RAF
 No. 307 Polish Night Fighter Squadron
 No. 515 Squadron RAF
 No. 527 Squadron RAF
 No. 577 Squadron RAF
 No. 598 Squadron RAF
 No. 600 Squadron RAF
 No. 603 Squadron RAF
 No. 604 Squadron RAF
 No. 618 Squadron RAF
 No. 680 Squadron RAF
 No. 684 Squadron RAF
 No. 695 Squadron RAF
 No. 1692 (Radio Development) Flight RAF

Royal Navy/Fleet Air Arm

 721 Naval Air Squadron
 726 Naval Air Squadron
 728 Naval Air Squadron
 733 Naval Air Squadron
 736 Naval Air Squadron
 762 Naval Air Squadron
 770 Naval Air Squadron
 772 Naval Air Squadron

 775 Naval Air Squadron
 779 Naval Air Squadron
 781 Naval Air Squadron
 788 Naval Air Squadron
 789 Naval Air Squadron
 797 Naval Air Squadron
 798 Naval Air Squadron

United States
United States Army Air Forces
414th Night Fighter Squadron
415th Night Fighter Squadron
416th Night Fighter Squadron
417th Night Fighter Squadron

See also
Bristol Beaufighter

References

Notes

Bibliography

 Bingham, Victor. Bristol Beaufighter. Shrewsbury, UK: Airlife Publishing, Ltd., 1994. .
 Bowyer, Chaz. Beaufighter. London: William Kimber, 1987. 0-71830-647-3.
 Bowyer, Chaz. Beaufighter at War. London: Ian Allan Ltd., 1994.  .
 Franks, Richard A. The Bristol Beaufighter, a Comprehensive Guide for the Modeller. Bedford, UK: SAM Publications, 2002. .
 Hall, Alan W. Bristol Beaufighter (Warpaint No. 1). Dunstable, UK: Hall Park Books, 1995.
 Howard. "Bristol Beaufighter-the inside story". Scale Aircraft Modelling, Vol. 11, No. 10, July 1989.
 Innes, Davis J. Beaufighters over Burma – 27 Sqn RAF 1942–45. Poole, Dorset, UK: Blandford Press, 1985.
 Francis K. Mason Archive: Bristol Beaufighter. Oxford, UK: Container Publications.
 Moyes, Philip J.R. The Bristol Beaufighter I & II (Aircraft in Profile Number 137). Leatherhead, Surrey, UK: Profile Publications Ltd., 1966.
 Parry, Simon W. Beaufighter Squadrons in Focus. Red Kite, 2001. .
 Scutts, Jerry. Bristol Beaufighter (Crowood Aviation Series). The Crowood Press Ltd., 2004. .
 Scutts, Jerry. Bristol Beaufighter in Action (Aircraft number 153). Carrollton, USA: Squadron/Signal Publications, 1995. .
 Thomas, Andrew. Beaufighter Aces of World War 2. Botley, UK: Osprey Publishing, 2005. .
 Wilson, Stewart. Beaufort, Beaufighter and Mosquito in Australian Service. Weston, ACT, Australia: Aerospace Publications, 1990. .

Lists of military units and formations by aircraft
Beaufighter